Smashed Gladys were an eighties glam metal band, formed in 1984, with Sally Cato on vocals, Bart Lewis on lead guitar, J.D. Malo on bass, and Matt Stelluto on drums. The band also had a succession of secondary guitar players (who, according to available credits, played some leads as well as rhythm): former LACE guitarist Tommy Wah in 1986, then Roger Lane from 1987 until the band's career ended. Cato and Lewis met in Canada, then moved to New York City, where they completed the line-up and built their career.

Ozzy Osbourne provided backing vocals for their song "Cast of Nasties". Lewis, Malo and Stelutto  made cameo appearances in the music video for the Run-D.M.C. cover of "Walk This Way".

Smashed Gladys's self-titled YouTube channel was curated by Sally Cato, the band's primary songwriter.

Lead vocalist Sally Cato died on 19 May 2020.

Discography

Albums
Smashed Gladys, 1985
Social Intercourse, 1988

Singles
"17 Goin' on Crazy", 1987
"Lick it Into Shape", 1988
"Legs Up", 1988

External links
Metal Maidens - Smashed Gladys
Interview

Glam metal musical groups from New York (state)
Heavy metal musical groups from New York (state)